The Tirsbol Cemetery, Wrought-Iron Cross Site (also known as Tiraspol Cemetery), near Strasburg, North Dakota, United States, is a historic site that was listed on the National Register of Historic Places in 1989.  It includes wrought-iron crosses.  It includes work by blacksmith Paul Keller.  The listing included three contributing objects.

Paul Keller, of Hague, was one of a number of "German-Russian blacksmiths in central North Dakota" who developed individual styles in their crosses and whose "work was known for miles around them."

References

External links
 
 

Cemeteries on the National Register of Historic Places in North Dakota
Cemeteries in Emmons County, North Dakota
German-Russian culture in North Dakota
National Register of Historic Places in Emmons County, North Dakota